"Shine Girl" is a song by British rapper MoStack featuring British rapper Stormzy. It was released through Virgin EMI as the second single from MoStack's debut studio album Stacko on 31 May 2019; where it peaked at number 13 on the UK Singles Chart. The song was written by MoStack, James Grant, Darius Ellington Forde , Levi Lennox, Stormzy and TSB, and produced by iLL BLU, TSB and Lennox.

Track listing

Charts

Certifications

References

2019 singles
2019 songs
MoStack songs
Songs written by Stormzy
Songs written by MoStack